Ali Choupani is an Iranian football forward who currently plays for Iranian football club Padideh on loan from Sepahan in the Iran Pro League.

Club career

Sepahan
Choupani started his career with Sepahan Academy. He promoted to first in 2012 after shining with Iran U20 and was given #26 but he never had any chances to make appearances. He signed a 3-year contract extension in summer 2014.

Padideh
He joined Padideh in summer 2014 while he signed one-year loan contract . He made his debut for Padideh
against his former club Sepahan as a substitute for Abbas Mohammadrezaei in 2014–15 Iran Pro League.

Club career statistics

References

External links
 Ali Choupani at PersianLeague.com
 Ali Choupani at IranLeague.ir

1993 births
Living people
Iranian footballers
Sepahan S.C. footballers
Shahr Khodro F.C. players
Sportspeople from Isfahan
Iran under-20 international footballers
Association football forwards